Case Inlet, in southern Puget Sound in the U.S. state of Washington, is an arm of water between Key Peninsula on the east and Hartstine Island on the west. Its northern end, called North Bay, reaches nearly to Hood Canal, creating the defining isthmus of Kitsap Peninsula. Case Inlet is the boundary between Pierce County and Mason County. The southern end of Case Inlet is connected to Nisqually Reach, part of the southern basin of Puget Sound. Herron Island lies in Case Inlet.

Case Inlet was named by Charles Wilkes of the Wilkes Expedition of 1838–1842, to honor Augustus L. Case, one of the expedition's officers.  From the 1870s to the 1920s, transportation needs of the communities along Case Inlet were served by a small flotilla of steamboats.

References

External links
 , USGS, GNIS entry

Inlets of Washington (state)
Bodies of water of Mason County, Washington
Bodies of water of Pierce County, Washington